In jazz theory, an avoid note is a scale degree which is considered especially dissonant relative to the harmony implied by the root chord, and is thus better avoided.

In major-key tonality the avoid note is the fourth diatonic scale step, or 11th, which is a minor ninth above the 3rd of the chord, and thus very harsh. In melody it is usually avoided, treated as a "scale approach note" or passing note, or sharpened. It is not available in harmony. The available tensions for a dominant seventh chord are 9, 11, and 13.

In minor harmony the sixth scale step is usually avoided, and the 13th is not regarded as an available tension.

In modal terms, the available scale steps of the mode (or available tensions for the chords) of the diatonic scale steps are those a whole step above the chord tones, and the avoid notes are those that are not. The only exception is the Dorian mode of the second scale degree, where the sixth is avoided although it is a whole step above the fifth; this is because the tritone between this and the third scale step would give an unwanted dominant quality. Taking C major as an example, the avoid notes are:

In his modal approach to minor harmony Haerle does not use the term avoid note, but discusses "intolerably dissonant" notes and how they should be resolved. For the melodic minor scale he gives these:

See also
Eleventh chord
Thirteenth chord
Tritone
Chord-scale system

References 

Consonance and dissonance
Jazz techniques
Jazz terminology